Nadutheri is a village near Thalavoor in Kollam District, Kerala state, India.

Politics
Nadutheri is a part of Thalavoor Grama panchayat, Pathanapuram Block panchayat and Kollam district Panchayat. It comes under Pathanapuram assembly constituency in Mavelikkara (Lok Sabha constituency). Shri. K. B. Ganesh Kumar is the current MLA of Pathanpuram. Shri.Kodikkunnil Suresh is the current member of parliament of Mavelikkara.

Geography
The main part of Nadutheri is a junction in Pathanapuram-Kottarakkara (via Kura) road. It connects places Kura, Parankimamukal, Randalummoodu etc. to Pathanapuram.

Demographics
Malayalam is the native language of Nadutheri.

References

Geography of Kollam district
Villages in Kollam district